David Ross Huddle (born July 11, 1942) is an American writer and professor. His poems, essays, and short stories have appeared in The New Yorker, Esquire, Harper's Magazine, The New York Times Magazine, Story, The Autumn House Anthology of Poetry, and The Best American Short Stories. His work has also been included in anthologies of writing about the Vietnam War. He is the recipient of two National Endowment for the Arts fellowships and currently teaches creative fiction, poetry, and autobiography at the University of Vermont and at the Bread Loaf School of English at Middlebury College. Huddle was born in Ivanhoe, Wythe County, Virginia, and he is sometimes considered an Appalachian writer. He served as an enlisted man in the U.S. Army from 1964 to 1967, in Germany as a paratrooper and then in Vietnam as a military intelligence specialist.

Bibliography
Poetry collections
 Paper Boy (University of Pittsburgh Press, 1979)
 Stopping by Home (Peregrine Smith Books, 1988)
 The Nature of Yearning: Poems (Peregrine Smith Books, 1992)
 Summer Lake: New and Selected Poems (Louisiana State University Press, 1999)
 Grayscale: Poems''' (Louisiana State University Press, 2004)
 Glory River: Poems (Louisiana State University Press, 2008)
 Roanoke Pastorale, A Villanelle in Simplicity (Palindrome Press, 2011)
 Blacksnake at the Family Reunion (Louisiana State University Press, 2012)

Fiction
 Dream with No Stump Roots in It: Stories (University of Missouri Press, 1975)
 Only the Little Bone: Stories (David R. Godine, 1986)
 The High Spirits: Stories of Men and Women (David R. Godine, 1989)
 Intimates: A Book of Stories (David R. Godine, 1993)
 A David Huddle Reader: Selected Prose and Poetry (University Press of New England, 1994)
 Tenorman: A Novella (Chronicle Books, 1995)
 The Story of a Million Years (Houghton Mifflin, 1999)
 Not: A Trio: Two Stories and a Novella (University of Notre Dame Press, 2000)
 La Tour Dreams of the Wolf Girl (Houghton Mifflin, 2002)
 Nothing Can Make Me Do This (Tupelo Press, 2012)
 The Faulkes Chronicle (Tupelo Press, 2014)

Essay collections
 The Writing Habit: Essays (University of Vermont/University Press of New England, 1994)

Anthologies edited
 About These Stories: Fiction for Fiction Writers and Readers'' (Edited with Ghita Orth, Allen Shepherd; McGraw Hill, 1995)

References

External links
 Audio Reading: The Writer's Almanac with Garrison Keillor > Poems by David Huddle
 Directory Listing: Poets & Writers > Directory of Writers > David Huddle
 Short Story: A River and Sound Review > Issue 1 > A Thousand Wives by David Huddle
 Interview: Emerging Writers Forum > 3/20/2002 Interview with David Huddle by Dan Wickett
 Audio Reading of Poem: The Cortland Review > Issue 10, February 2000 > April Saturday, 1960 by David Huddle

1942 births
Living people
20th-century American novelists
Novelists from Virginia
University of Vermont faculty
Middlebury College faculty
People from Wythe County, Virginia
Writers from Burlington, Vermont
National Endowment for the Arts Fellows
United States Army personnel of the Vietnam War
Place of birth missing (living people)
21st-century American novelists
20th-century American poets
21st-century American poets
American male novelists
American male essayists
American male poets
20th-century American essayists
21st-century American essayists
Novelists from Vermont
20th-century American male writers
21st-century American male writers